Nevermind, It's an Interview is the only officially released interview CD of American grunge band Nirvana. It was only a promotional release and was never commercially available. Released in limited-edition form worldwide in 1992 by Geffen Records, written, produced and engineered at WFNX Boston by Kurt St. Thomas and Troy Smith, (authors of Nirvana: The Chosen Rejects, (St. Martin's Press, 2004). The original interview sessions were recorded by St. Thomas the night of Nirvana's first appearance on NBC's Saturday Night Live in 1992.  It contains over an hour of audio interview with live and studio recordings. The reason for its production was for radio stations world-wide to have a Nirvana interview to play because at that time the band was so popular that it was not possible for them to visit all the radio stations that were playing their music. Copies of the CD are rare and have become collectors items. However, for a limited time, the entire CD was included at the end of the iTunes version of With the Lights Out, Nirvana's posthumous box set. It is listed as:

"Nevermind It's an Interview, Pt.1"
"Nevermind It's an Interview, Pt.2"
"Nevermind It's an Interview, Pt.3"

All songs are incomplete unless otherwise noted. The live versions of "Drain You" and "School" were released on some versions of the "Come as You Are" single. The back cover reads: "Kurt St Thomas, Music director of WFNX, Boston, speaks with Kurt Cobain, Krist Novoselic and Dave Grohl about life in Nirvana, circa 1992."

Track listing 
Track 1:
 "Breed"
 "Stay Away"
 "School"
 "Mr. Moustache"
 "Sifting"
 "In Bloom"
 "Spank Thru"
 "Floyd the Barber"
 "Scoff"
 "Love Buzz"
 "About a Girl" (live, full)
 "Dive"
 "Sliver"
 "Aneurysm" (live, full)

Track 2:
 "Lithium"
 "Even in His Youth"
 "Drain You" (live, October 31, 1991, full)
 "Something in the Way"
 "Come as You Are"
 "Polly"
 "In Bloom"
 "Smells Like Teen Spirit"
 "On a Plain" (live, full)
 "Stay Away"
 "Endless, Nameless"

Track 3: 
 "Molly's Lips" (live)
 "Stain"
 "School" (live, October 31, 1991, full)
 "Big Cheese"
 "Been a Son"
 "Territorial Pissings" (full) 
 "Smells Like Teen Spirit" (full)

References

See also

Nevermind (album)
Classic Albums: Nirvana – Nevermind (DVD)
Nirvana discography

Interview albums
Nirvana (band) live albums
1992 live albums
Geffen Records live albums